Rise and Fall of a Decade is an internationally acclaimed French band trio 
founded in 1988 by Thierry Sintoni, Pierre-François Maurin-Malet and Sandy Casado.

Since 1997, their music videos have been directed by Nemo Sandman.

In May 2007 Pierre-François died of cancer. A tribute CD was recorded.

Since March 2016, Sandy and Thierry are forming a new duo called Girls Like You.

Discography 
Love It or Leave It (11/2008), double album including A Tribute to Pierre-François
Yesterday, Today & Tomorrow (07/2007), best of album
You or Sidney - Re-Release (05/2007)
Noisy but empty - Re-Release (05/2007)
Forget the twentieth century (1997)
Rise and Fall of a Decade - Re-Release (1995)
Mistake EP (1995)
Ubu Reine, live album (1995)
You or Sidney (1994)
Noisy but empty (1992)
An evening with Bernard EP (1991), recording of their Black Session on Radio France. Black Sessions are the French equivalent to John Peel Sessions
Rise and Fall of a Decade (1990)

External links 
Official Site
Rafoad on Myspace
Rafoad on Last.fm
Girls Like You page on Facebook

References 

Dream pop musical groups
French electronic music groups